Lenaderg is a small village and townland of  in County Down, Northern Ireland. It sits on the banks of the River Bann, about two miles from Banbridge and a half mile from the village of Lawrencetown. It is situated in the civil parish of Tullylish and the historic barony of Iveagh Lower, Upper Half. In the 2001 Census it had a population of 261 people. Lenaderg is within the District of Banbridge.

Its name is derived from the Irish language. One theory is that it comes from Léana Dhearg meaning "red meadow". However, the townland was historically called Laraderick and Laraghderick, which is believed to be derived from Láithreach Deirce.

Industry
Milltown Bleach Works at Lenaderg, was demolished mid-20th century. A group of mill workers’ houses still remains.

Transport
Lenaderg railway station was opened on 1 January 1904, closed to passengers in 1907 and finally closed altogether on 2 May 1955. It was on the line from Scarva to Banbridge.

See also 
List of towns and villages in Northern Ireland
List of townlands in County Down

References 

Townlands of County Down
Villages in County Down
Civil parish of Tullylish